Invermark Lodge is a hunting lodge which was built near Invermark Castle in 1852 for John Ramsay, 13th Earl of Dalhousie.  It is now a listed building and continues to be operated as a grouse moor by the Dalhousie family.

References

Category B listed buildings in Angus, Scotland
Hunting lodges in Scotland